Dennis M. Perluss (born May 12, 1948) is the Presiding Justice of the California Second District Court of Appeal, Division Seven, having been appointed to the post by Governor Gray Davis in 2003.

Perluss received an A.B. from Stanford University in 1970 and a J.D. from Harvard Law School in 1973.  From 1973–1974, he was a law clerk to U.S. Ninth Circuit Court of Appeals Judge Shirley Hufstedler.  From 1974–1975, he was a law clerk to U.S. Supreme Court Justice Potter Stewart.  After his clerkship ended, Perluss was an attorney, until 1999, when Governor Gray Davis appointed him to the Los Angeles County Superior Court.  In 2001, Davis appointed him as an associate justice of the California Second District Court of Appeal, Division Seven and then elevated him to Presiding Justice in 2003.

Perluss and his wife, Rabbi Emily H. Feigenson, Chaplain at the Harvard-Westlake School, live in Los Angeles with their three children.

See also 
 List of law clerks of the Supreme Court of the United States (Seat 8)

References

External links
Official biography of Dennis M. Perluss
Dennis Perluss profile on Judgepedia

1948 births
Harvard Law School alumni
Judges of the California Courts of Appeal
Law clerks of the Supreme Court of the United States
Lawyers from Los Angeles
Lawyers from Sacramento, California
Living people
Politicians from Sacramento, California
Stanford University alumni
21st-century American judges